Between the Lines is the second studio album by Australian pop singer Jason Donovan. It was released on 29 May 1990 by PWL and Mushroom.

Background 

Produced by the team Stock Aitken Waterman, the album reached No.2 in the UK charts, and was certified platinum by the British Phonographic Industry. The album features five UK Top 30 singles: "When You Come Back to Me" (UK #2), "Hang On to Your Love" (UK #8), "Another Night" (UK #18), "Rhythm of the Rain" (UK #9) and "I'm Doin' Fine" (UK #22), released between 1989 and 1990.  The album was far less successful in Donovan's native Australia, where it peaked at no.77 in December 1990.

Donovan supported the album with a national tour of the UK and Ireland, titled the "Doin' Fine Tour", which began in June 1990.

This was Donovan's last album for the SAW production team and the following year saw him take the lead role in the West End musical Joseph and the Amazing Technicolor Dreamcoat.

Like his previous album, the title was taken from a line in one of the songs—in this case, the opening line of "When It's All Over" ("should have read between the lines..."). This title also became the name of Donovan's autobiography, released in 2007.

Between the Lines was re-issued in 2010 by Edsel records as a double CD set.  In a review of its re-release, Music Week said this it was "arguably better" than his first album.

Track listing 
All tracks written by Stock Aitken Waterman, unless otherwise noted.

Side one
 "When You Come Back to Me" – 3:33
 "Hang On to Your Love" – 3:01
 "Another Night" – 3:26
 "Love Would Find a Way" – 3:32
 "Rhythm of the Rain" (John Claude Gummoe) – 3:09

Side two
 "I'm Doin' Fine" – 3:01
 "Careless Talk and Silly Lies" – 3:25
 "When It's All Over" – 3:42
 "Like it Was Yesterday" – 2:56
 "Hard to Say It's Over" – 3:34

Re-issue
CD 1
 "When You Come Back to Me"
 "Hang On to Your Love"
 "Another Night"
 "Love Would Find a Way"
 "Rhythm of the Rain"
 "I’m Doin' Fine"
 "Careless Talk and Silly Lies"
 "When It's All Over"
 "Like It Was Yesterday 
 "Hard To Say It's Over"
 "R.S.V.P"
 "Happy Together"
 "A Fool Such As I"
 "Story Of My Life"
 "When I Get You Alone"
 "She's In Love With You"
 "Hang On To Your Love (Extended Version)"
 "Another Night (Sweet Dreams Mix)"
 "I'm Doing Fine (Extended Version)"
 "El Ritmo De La Lluvia (Rhythm Of The Rain - Spanish Version)"
 "When You Come Back To Me (Yuletide Sleigh List Mix)"

CD 2
 "When You Come Back to Me (Extended Version)"
 "Rhythm of the Rain (Extended Version)"
 "Story Of My Life (Extended Version)"
 "R.S.V.P. (Extended Version)"
 "Happy Together (Extended Version)"
 "She's In Love With You (Extended Version)"
 "When You Come Back to Me (No Probs Mix)"
 "Another Night (The JD in Dub Mix)"
 "Rhythm of the Rain (Kick That… Remix)"
 "When You Come Back to Me (Original Mix)"
 "Hang On to Your Love (Instrumental)"
 "Another Night (Instrumental)"
 "Rhythm of the Rain (Instrumental)"
 "I’m Doing Fine (Instrumental)"
 "R.S.V.P. (Instrumental)"
 "Happy Together (Instrumental)"
 "When You Come Back To Me (Guitar Instrumental)"

Personnel 
Karen Hewitt, Yoyo – engineers
Phil Harding, Pete Hammond, Dave Ford – mixers
Mike Stock, Matt Aitken – keyboards
Matt Aitken – guitars
A Linn – drums
Mae McKenna, Miriam Stockley, Linda Taylor, Mike Stock – backing vocals
Recorded at PWL Studios, London
Simon Fowler – photography
Jason Donovan, David Howells – design
Lino Carbosiero – hair

Charts

Sales and certifications

References 

1990 albums
Albums produced by Stock Aitken Waterman
Jason Donovan albums
Mushroom Records albums